Money Is Still a Major Issue (backronym of M.I.S.A.M.I) is a remix album by rapper Pitbull. It was released on November 15, 2005, and features several of his guest appearances, remixes and some unreleased tracks.

Track listing
Disc 1
 "Everybody Get Up" (Pretty Ricky featuring Pitbull)
 "Rah Rah" (Remix) (Elephant Man featuring Pitbull & Daddy Yankee)
 "Shake" (Remix) (Ying Yang Twins featuring Pitbull & Elephant Man)
 "Culo" (Remix) (Pitbull featuring Lil Jon & Ivy Queen)
 "Mil Amores" (Remix) (Master Joe & O.G. Black featuring Pitbull)
 "Turnin' Me On" (Remix) (Nina Sky featuring Pitbull)
 "She's Hotter" (T.O.K. featuring Pitbull)
 "Get to Poppin' (Remix) (Rich Boy featuring Pitbull)
 "Might Be the Police" (Brisco featuring Pitbull)
 "Who U Rollin' With" (Pitbull featuring Piccallo & Cubo)
 "Dammit Man" (Remix) (Pitbull featuring Lil' Flip)
 "Oh No He Didn't" (Pitbull featuring Cubo)
 "Toma" (Dj Buddha Remix) (Pitbull featuring Lil Jon, Mr. Vegas, Wayne Marshall, Red Rat, T.O.K., & Kardinal Offishall)

Disc 2
 "Culo" (Video)
 "Dammit Man" (Video)
 "Toma" (Video)
 Live performances and interviews

Charts

Weekly charts

Year-end charts

References

Spanish-language albums
Pitbull (rapper) albums
Albums produced by Jim Jonsin
Albums produced by Mr. Collipark
2005 remix albums
TVT Records remix albums